The Standard Oil Company Headquarters are a cluster of historic commercial buildings at 1600 Meeting Street in Charleston, South Carolina.  The main building is a distinctive commercial take on Charleston's residential architecture, with a two-story porch wrapping around its north and west sides.  The three buildings were built in 1926 for the Standard Oil Company of New Jersey, housing management and other facilities associated with the adjacent Charleston Refinery.

The complex was listed on the National Register of Historic Places in 2015.

See also
National Register of Historic Places listings in Charleston, South Carolina

References

National Register of Historic Places in Charleston, South Carolina
Commercial buildings on the National Register of Historic Places in South Carolina
Buildings and structures in Charleston County, South Carolina